24 Carrots is the ninth studio album by Al Stewart, released in 1980. It was Stewart's first album with his new band Shot in the Dark. Tracks 1-4 are co-written with Peter White. The single "Midnight Rocks" reached #24 on the Billboard chart in 1980. Two other singles were released from the album: "Mondo Sinistro" and "Paint By Numbers". The album has been re-released in 2007 with bonus tracks and in 2020 for its 40th Anniversary.

Three music videos were created for the singles, with them featuring Stewart and backing band Shot in the Dark playing in a typical band set-up, although the "Mondo Sinistro" video also featured Stewart in some quirky restaurant scenes hitting on a young waitress (played by Cassandra Peterson, prior to her fame as Elvira, Mistress of the Dark).

Track listing
All tracks composed by Al Stewart except A 1-4 by Al Stewart and Peter White.

1980 Original LP edition

1994 Razor & Tie edition bonus tracks

2007 Collector's Choice Music edition bonus tracks

2020 Esoteric Recordings (Cherry Red UK) 40th Anniversary 3CD set

Personnel

Al Stewart – vocals, acoustic guitar, electric guitar, synthesizer
Shot in the Dark
Peter White – keyboards, acoustic guitar, electric guitar, synthesizer
Adam Yurman – electric guitar, backing vocals
Robin Lamble – bass guitar, backing vocals, acoustic guitar, percussion
Krysia Kristianne – backing vocals
Bryan Savage – alto saxophone, flute
Additional musicians
Harry Stinson – backing vocals
Ken Nicol – backing vocals
Bob Marlette – keyboards, synthesizer
Russ Kunkel – drums
Mark Sanders – drums
Jeff Porcaro – drums
Steve Chapman – drums
Beau Segal – drums
Lenny Castro – congas
Robin Williamson – mandocello
Sylvia Woods – Celtic harp
Jerry McMillan – violin

Charts

References

Al Stewart albums
1980 albums
RCA Records albums
Arista Records albums
Razor & Tie albums
Collectors' Choice Music albums